Susanna is a feminine first name, of Egyptian and Persian origin. It is the name of women in the Biblical books of Daniel and Luke. It is often spelled Susannah, although Susanna is the original spelling. It is derived from the  Egyptian shoshen meaning "lotus flower". 
Arabic سوسن (Sausan) meaning "lily". Persian سوسن (Susan) is the Persian spelling of this name and the Armenian: Susan, Shushan-Սուսան (Սուսաննա)= Շուշան (Շուշաննա, Շուշանիկ) is means a flower Lilium (Լիլիա). The spelling Susanna is used in Sweden, Italy, the Netherlands and Finland, as well as in the English-speaking world. The spelling Zuzana is used in Czech Republic and Slovakia and spelling Zsuzsanna in Hungary. In Poland it is Zuzanna. Even though very uncommon, it is also spelled Susana in Spain and Portugal, where it is more common.

The  Hebrew form Shoshana is still commonly used by Jewish people in the diaspora and in contemporary Israel, often shortened to "Shosh" or "Shoshi".

List of people with the given name Susanna
 Susanna (disciple), one of the women associated with the ministry of Jesus of Nazareth
 Susanna, a woman mentioned in Additions to Daniel
 Saint Susanna
 Suzana Ansar British Bengali Singer and TV personality 
 Susanna Clarke, British author
 Susanna Dinnage, British television businesswoman
 Susanna M. D. Fry, American educator, activist
 Susanna Hall, William Shakespeare's first daughter
 Suzanna Hext, British para swimmer and equestrian
 Susanna Hoffs, American musician
 Susanna Maiolo (born 1984), Italo-Swiss attacker of Pope Benedict XVI
 Susanna Mälkki, Finnish cellist and conductor
 Susanna Nerantzi, Greek pianist and composer
 Suzanna Randall, German astrophysicist
 Suzanna Sablairolles, Dutch actress
 Susanna Tamaro, Italian author
 Susanna Wallumrød (born 1979), Norwegian singer
 Susanna Wesley, mother of John Wesley and Charles Wesley
 Suzzanna, Indonesian Actress
 Suzana Ansar, British Bengali singer and TV personality
 Susannah Carr, Australian newsreader

Fictional characters with the given name Susanna
 Focal character of "Oh! Susanna", a popular Gold Rush era song by Stephen Foster
 Susanna, a principal character in Mozart's 1786 opera The Marriage of Figaro

Events
 Killing of Susanna Feldmann, a crime that occurred in Germany in 2018

See also
 Susanna (disambiguation)
 Susan (given name)
 Susann
 Susanne (given name)
 Susana (given name)
 Susannah (given name)
 Suzanne (given name)
 Sanna (name)
 Susie (disambiguation)
 Susy (disambiguation)
 Suzy (disambiguation)
 Suzie (disambiguation)
 Suze (disambiguation)
 Shoshana

Given names of Hebrew language origin
English feminine given names
Estonian feminine given names
Given names derived from plants or flowers
Italian feminine given names
Swedish feminine given names